Shelly Lynn Harvey is a professor of Mathematics at Rice University. Her research interests include knot theory, low-dimensional topology, and group theory.

Early life

Harvey grew up in Rancho Cucamonga, California and graduated California Polytechnic State University in 1997. She received her Ph.D. from Rice University in 2002 under the supervision of Tim Cochran. After postdoctoral studies at the University of California, San Diego and the Massachusetts Institute of Technology, she returned to Rice University in 2005 as the first female tenure-track mathematician there.

Recognitions

Harvey was a Sloan Fellow in 2006. In 2012, she became one of the inaugural fellows of the American Mathematical Society.

Selected publications
.
. 
.

References

External links
Shelly Harvey's official website

Living people
American women mathematicians
Fellows of the American Mathematical Society
California Polytechnic State University alumni
Rice University alumni
Rice University faculty
21st-century American mathematicians
Topologists
21st-century women mathematicians
Year of birth missing (living people)
21st-century American women scientists